Erik Håkan Pettersson (born 4 April 1944) is a retired Swedish cyclist. He was part of the road racing team of four Pettersson brothers, known as Fåglum brothers, who won the world title in 1967–1969 and a silver medal at the 1968 Olympics; three of the brothers were also part of the bronze-winning road team at the 1964 Games. In 1967 they were awarded the Svenska Dagbladet Gold Medal.

Erik was the fastest sprinter among the Fåglum brothers; he was nicknamed Rödtoppen for his red hair. He turned professional after the 1969 World Championships, together with the other brothers, but had little success and retired in 1971.

Major results

1964
 3rd  Team time trial, Summer Olympics
1966
 1st  Team time trial, National Road Championships (with Sture & Gösta Pettersson)
1967
 1st  Team time trial, UCI Road World Championships (with Sture, Tomas & Gösta Pettersson)
 National Road Championships
1st  Road race
1st  Team time trial (with Sture & Gösta Pettersson)
 3rd Overall Tour du Maroc
1968
 1st  Team time trial, UCI Road World Championships (with Sture, Tomas & Gösta Pettersson)
 2nd  Team time trial, Summer Olympics (with Sture, Tomas & Gösta Pettersson)
1969
 1st  Team time trial, UCI Road World Championships (with Sture, Tomas & Gösta Pettersson)
1970
 5th Coppa Placci
 9th Overall Paris–Luxembourg
1971
 5th Overall Tour de Romandie
 5th Overall Paris–Nice

References

External links
 

1944 births
Living people
Swedish male cyclists
Olympic cyclists of Sweden
Olympic silver medalists for Sweden
Olympic bronze medalists for Sweden
Olympic medalists in cycling
Cyclists at the 1964 Summer Olympics
Cyclists at the 1968 Summer Olympics
Sportspeople from Västra Götaland County
Medalists at the 1964 Summer Olympics
Medalists at the 1968 Summer Olympics
UCI Road World Champions (elite men)
Fåglum brothers